Tenishevo (Teneş) is an urban locality (an urban-type settlement) in Kamsko-Ustyinsky District of the Republic of Tatarstan, Russia. As of the 2010 Census, its population was 809.

History
It was established in the 1930s and was granted urban-type settlement status in 1997. Until October 17, 2002, it was known as imeni 9 yanvarya.

Administrative and municipal status
Within the framework of administrative divisions, the urban-type settlement of Tenishevo is subordinated to Kamsko-Ustyinsky District. As a municipal division, Tenishevo is incorporated within Kamsko-Ustyinsky Municipal District as Tenishevo Urban Settlement.

References

Notes

Sources

Urban-type settlements in the Republic of Tatarstan